Ungnyeo (lit. 'bear woman') was a bear that became a woman according to the creation myth of the Korean nation.

Story
In the tale, a tiger and a bear lived together in a cave and prayed to the divine king Hwanung (the Son of Heaven and son to Hwanin) to be made human. Hwanung heard their prayers and gave them 20 cloves of garlic, a bundle of mugwort and ordered them to stay out of the sunlight and eat only this food for 100 days. Due to hunger, the tiger left the cave after roughly 20 days, but the bear remained inside. After 21 days, she was transformed into a woman, and came to be known as the bear woman Ungnyeo.

Ungnyeo was grateful and made offerings to Hwanung. Her lack of a husband drove her to depression, and she began to pray beneath a sacred betula tree to be blessed with a child. Hwanung heard her prayers and was deeply moved.  He took Ungnyeo as his wife and soon after, she gave birth to a son, Dangun, who would go on to found the nation of Korea.

Interpretation of the story 
There are two main characteristics of Ungnyeo. The founding myth of the Korean ancient nation generally sets the founder's paternal blood line as the Cheonsin (sky god) and the mother line as the Jisin (land god). As a result, Ungnyeo is regarded as a type of totem deified by Dangun's mother lineage.

On the other hand, the bear itself has religious implications. The bear is the god of the land and symbolizes the uterus that produces products in farming culture. Thus, bears are predominantly interpreted as female. Ungnyeo is also interpreted as a kind of goddess.

See also 

 Dangun

References

External links
 Myth of Korea: Dangun

Korean goddesses
Korean legendary creatures
Mythological bears
Dangun